State Route 46 (SR 46) is a primary state highway in the U.S. state of Virginia. The state highway begins at the North Carolina state line near Valentines, where the highway continues as North Carolina Highway 46 (NC 46). The state highway serves as the main north–south highway of Brunswick County, where it intersects U.S. Route 58 (US 58) in Lawrenceville and both Interstate 85 (I-85) and US 1 near Alberta.

All of SR 46 in Brunswick County is a Virginia Byway.

Route description

SR 46 begins at the North Carolina state line south of the community of Valentines.  The roadway continues southeast as NC 46 toward Gaston.  The Virginia state highway heads north as Christanna Highway through southern Brunswick County, where the highway passes through Valentines and Brunswick.  SR 46 passes to the east of the remains of Fort Christanna before crossing the Meherrin River.  The state highway meets US 58 (Governor Harrison Parkway) at a diamond interchange and begins to run concurrently with US 58 Business.  The two highways enter the county seat of Lawrenceville on Hicks Street.  After passing over a rail line, SR 46 and US 58 Business turn east onto Meredith Street, then north onto Main Street.  The highways separate when SR 46 turns west onto Church Street.  The state highway veers northwest onto Windsor Street while passing along the edge of St. Paul's College.

SR 46's name again becomes Christanna Highway as it heads northwest toward the hamlet of Cochran west of Alberta.  In Cochran, the state highway intersects US 1 (Boydton Plank Road) adjacent to the Christanna campus of Southside Virginia Community College and has a partial interchange with I-85 that allows access in the direction of South Hill.  Access to northbound I-85 toward Petersburg is provided via US 1.  SR 46 continues northwest to the village of Danieltown, where the highway meets the eastern end of SR 137 (Danieltown Road).  SR 46 enters Nottoway County when it crosses the Nottoway River on the Kennedy Bridge just east of the Nottoway Reservoir.  The state highway, now known as Brunswick Road, passes through the southwestern portion of Fort Pickett before reaching its northern terminus at SR 40 (Kenbridge Road) just south of the town of Blackstone.

Major intersections

VA 46 Truck

Virginia State Truck Route 46 in Lawrenceville, Virginia is overlapped by US 58, also known as the Governor Harrison Parkway between the Hicks Street and Lawrenceville Plank Road interchanges. From there, it follows US 58 Bus into downtown to rejoin mainline SR 46.

References

External links

Virginia Highways Project: VA 46

046
State Route 046
State Route 046
046